Prior to its uniform adoption of proportional representation in 1999, the United Kingdom used first-past-the-post for the European elections in England, Scotland and Wales. The European Parliament constituencies used under that system were smaller than the later regional constituencies and only had one Member of the European Parliament each.

The constituency of Shropshire and Stafford was one of them.

It consisted of the Westminster Parliament constituencies (on their 1983 boundaries) of Cannock and Burntwood, Ludlow, Newcastle-under-Lyme, North Shropshire, Shrewsbury and Atcham, South Staffordshire, Stafford, and The Wrekin.

Lord Kingsland, then Christoper Prout, was the sole representative during this constituency's existence.

MEPs

Election results

References

External links
 David Boothroyd's United Kingdom Election Results

European Parliament constituencies in England (1979–1999)
Politics of Shropshire
Politics of Staffordshire
1984 establishments in England
1994 disestablishments in England
Constituencies established in 1984
Constituencies disestablished in 1994